Route 145 is a -long north-south secondary highway in northeast New Brunswick, Canada.

The routes western terminus is at Route 325 in Bertrand. From there, it runs east along Caraquet Bay and Chaleur Bay through the town of Caraquet following the previous alignment of Route 11 before crossing onto Pokesudie Island.

History
Route 145 was commissioned in 1984 as a renumbering of the former Route 330, which had existed since 1965.
October 2016 the route was extended continuing where the former Route 11 used to be.

Communities
 Pointe a Marcelle
 Bertrand
 Caraquet
 Bas-Caraquet
 Pokesudie

See also
List of New Brunswick provincial highways

References

145
145
Caraquet